Boloria jerdoni, the Jerdon's silverspot, is a butterfly of the family Nymphalidae. It is found in the western Himalayas and from Chitral to Kashmir.

References

Boloria
Butterflies described in 1868